The Vision of Saint Anthony of Padua or Saint Anthony with the Christ Child is an oil on canvas painting by the Italian artist Giambattista Pittoni, completed in August 1730 in Venice. It is now in the San Diego Museum of Art in California, which acquired it in 1948.

It was displayed in the exhibition 'The Allure of La Serenissima: Eighteenth-Century Venetian Art' (9/9/2010 - 1/2/2011).

References

1730 paintings
Paintings of Anthony of Padua
Paintings in the collection of the San Diego Museum of Art
Paintings depicting Jesus
Paintings by Giambattista Pittoni